The Fujifilm FinePix Z-series of digital cameras consists of the company's ultra-slim and lightweight point-and-shoot digital cameras.  All Z-series cameras feature non-protruding folded optic design lenses and sliding lens covers, excluding the waterproof Z33WP, which has no lens cover. The w early Z-series cameras featured Fujifilm's Super CCD sensor, while later ones use other CCD sensors. Some newer models (Z700EXR, Z800EXR Z900EXR and Z1000EXR) use the EXR-CMOS sensors.

Models
2011+2012 models
FinePix Z1000EXR
FinePix Z900EXR
FinePix Z110
FinePix Z90

Earlier models
FinePix Z1
FinePix Z2
FinePix Z3
FinePix Z5fd
FinePix Z100fd
FinePix Z200fd
FinePix Z300
FinePix Z10fd
FinePix Z20fd
FinePix Z33WP
FinePix Z30
FinePix Z35
FinePix Z37
FinePix Z70
FinePix Z700EXR
FinePix Z80
FinePix Z800EXR
FinePix Z900EXR

See also 
 Fujifilm FinePix
 Fujifilm cameras
 Fujifilm

References

Z-series